The third season of Degrassi: Next Class premiered on January 9, 2017 on Family Channel under the teen block F2N in Canada and began streaming internationally on January 6, 2017 on Netflix.

Synopsis 
This season now follows the same batch of students now as juniors and seniors and follows the fallout following the bus crash, and  how the school is trying to heal after the "accident" that left 2 students in conditions they could never come back from. It's also shown that over the summer, four unlikely romances blossomed while two others burned out. It will also continue to tell the stories of high school drama with groundbreaking stories such as sex, abortion, immigration, depression, oppositional defiant disorder, major depressive, traumatic brain injury, dysfunctional families, sexuality, homophobia, hormones, religion, protest, disabilities, cystic fibrosis, Teen pregnancy and suicide attempts.

Cast

Series regulars 
The third season has twenty-one actors receiving star billing with all nineteen of them returning from the previous season. Those in bold are new to the cast this season.

Amanda Arcuri as Lola Pacini (9 episodes)
Amir Bageria as Baaz Nahir (6 episodes)
Soma Bhatia as Goldi Nahir (7 episodes)
Jamie Bloch as Yael Baron (7 episodes)
Stefan Brogren as Principal Archie "Snake" Simpson (2 episodes)
Chelsea Clark as Esme Song (7 episodes)
Reiya Downs as Shaylynn "Shay" Powers (7 episodes)
Ana Golja as Zoë Rivas (8 episodes)
Nikki Gould as Grace Cardinal (10 episodes)
Ricardo Hoyos as Zigmund "Zig" Novak (7 episodes)
Ehren Kassam as Jonah Haak (10 episodes)
André Kim as Winston "Chewy" Chu (5 episodes)
Lyle Lettau as Tristan Milligan (7 episodes)
Spencer MacPherson as Hunter Hollingsworth (6 episodes)
Eric Osborne as Miles Hollingsworth III (9 episodes)
Parham Rownaghi as Saad Al'Maliki (6 episodes)
Dante Scott as Vijay Maraj (5 episodes)
Olivia Scriven as Maya Matlin (8 episodes)
Sara Waisglass as Francesca "Frankie" Hollingsworth (9 episodes)
Richard Walters as Deon "Tiny" Bell (7 episodes)
Dalia Yegavian as Rasha Zuabi (8 episodes)

Supporting Cast

Parents
Kate Hewlett as Margaret Matlin (5 episodes)
America Olivo as Ms. Consuela Rivas (3 episodes)
Nahanni Johnstone as Mrs. Milligan (3 episodes)Booth Savage as Phillip Hawthorne (2 episodes)
Cheri Maracle as Ms. Cardinal (1 episode)

Faculty
Tom Melissis as Mr. Dom Perino (4 episodes)
Michael Kinney as Coach Darryl Armstrong (3 episodes)
Aisha Alfa as Ms. Grell (3 episodes)
Michael Brown as Mr. Blake Mitchell (1 episode)
Ashley Comeau as Ms. Badger (1 episode)

Alumni & Guest Stars
Tariq Azees as Syrian Male Student (6 episodes)
Kyle Marasciulo as Mitchel Kirkwood (2 episodes)
Chloe Rose as Katie Matlin (2 episodes)
Paula MacPherson as Dr. Narello (2 episodes)
Vivianne Collins as Interviewer (1 episode)
Ken MacDougall as Driving Examiner (1 episode)
Naja Stanford as Eve (1 episode)
Glenda Braganza as Cystic Fibrosis Doctor (1 episode)
Jane Johanson as Clinic Nurse (1 episode)
Glen Michael Grant as Dr. Bainford (1 episode)

Production
This season along with season 4 were renewed in April 2016. Production on the season officially began a month prior when casting calls for two new leads were released. Filming commenced in May 2016 and finished in August of the same year. The season is expected to premiere on January 6, 2017 on Netflix internationally and on January 9, 2017 on Family Channel's 'F2N' teen block. On F2N, it will run for two weeks and use the telenovela format. The season premiered at midnight on January 6, 2017, on the Family Channel App.

Episodes

References

External links
 List of Degrassi: Next Class episodes at IMDB.

Degrassi (franchise)
2017 Canadian television seasons